The Goleț is a left tributary of the river Timiș in Romania. It discharges into the Timiș near Bucoșnița.

References

Rivers of Romania
Rivers of Caraș-Severin County